Sira is a 2023 co-production drama film, written and directed by Apolline Traoré and starring Nafissatou Cissé, Mike Danon, Lazare Minoungou, Nathalie Vairac and Ruth Werner. The film depicts the story of young nomad named Sira, who after a brutal attack refuses to surrender to her fate without a fight and instead takes a stand against Islamist terror.

It had its world premiere on 21 February 2023 at the 73rd Berlin International Film Festival, where it won the Panorama Audience Award for best feature.

Synopsis

The film set in the Sahel tells the story of a young Fulani girl, Sira travelling to meet her groom Jean-Sidi. Suddenly she and her family are attacked by Islamist terrorists. All the men are shot and the leader of the gang, Yéré takes Sira and rape her. Left for dead in the desert, Sira finds herself alone and take refuge in a cave as she weaves her survival plan.

Cast

 Nafissatou Cissé as Sira
 Mike Danon as Moustapha
 Lazare Minoungou as Yere
 Nathalie Vairac as Aissatou
 Ruth Werner as Kemi
 Abdramane Barry as Jean Sidi
 Ildevert Meda as Karim
 Oumou Ba as Djamila
 Seydou Diallo as Tidiane
 Moïse Tiemtore as Faysal

Production

The film received grant from World Cinema Fund (WCF Africa Program) of €39,000 in November 2021. 

The lead actor, Nafissatou Cissé was selected out of more than 1,000 girls, who were auditioned. It was filmed in Mauritania, Northwest Africa.

Release

Sira had its premiere on 21 February 2023, as part of the 73rd Berlin International Film Festival, in Panorama. It is also invited at the 2023 Panafrican Film and Television Festival of Ouagadougou, in competition. On 14 February it was reported that Paris-based sales company Wide has acquired worldwide rights of the film.

Reception

Vladan Petkovic reviewing for Cineuropa praised Nafissatou Cissé writing, "It is Cissé who grabs the audience with her all-out performance, making the film more poignant than a simple rape-revenge set-up." Petkovic appreciated the director Apolline Traoré and Cinematographer Nicolas Berteyac's "complex choreography of numerous characters, animals and vehicles that populate the wide shots". He praised editor Sylvie Gadmer, who he opined, "deftly combines them [shots] with intense close-ups," and composer Cyril Morin, for "mostly well-distributed score". For the film Petkovic opined,"Traoré has devised the story in a way that is both clever and honest", which is set in an exotic location "with a fierce African woman as a protagonist who fights back against all odds". He added, all that makes it a "rare African audience-friendly film to break out internationally."

Accolades

References

External links

 
 Sira at Berlinale
 Sira at Crew United 

2023 films
French drama films
2023 drama films
2020s French-language films
2020s German films
2020s French films
Burkinabé drama films
Senegalese drama films
Films set in Africa
Films shot in Mauritania
Islamic terrorism in fiction
Films about terrorism in Africa